Robert Scott Jenks (born March 14, 1981) is an American former professional baseball pitcher. He played in Major League Baseball (MLB) for the Chicago White Sox and Boston Red Sox from 2005 through 2011.

He also threw a slider, changeup, and a hard, sharp-breaking curveball. Jenks is third all-time in saves by a pitcher in a White Sox uniform. Jenks is a two-time All-Star who formerly held the major league record for retiring consecutive batters (41).

Amateur career
Jenks was not able to play with his teammates at Timberlake High School, in Spirit Lake, Idaho or Inglemoor High School in Kenmore, Washington, because of poor grades. Jenks did play his sophomore year of high school for Lakeland High School before Timberlake High School was opened in 1998. Since Jenks was ineligible to play the remaining years of his high school career due to poor academic performance, he played in the Prairie Cardinals American Legion program where he dominated as both a pitcher and hitter. During his final season for the Prairie Cardinals, Jenks had 123 strikeouts in 92 innings pitched.

Professional career

Anaheim Angels
Jenks was drafted by the Anaheim Angels in the fifth round (140th overall) of the 2000 Major League Baseball Draft. In one minor league game, the radar gun clocked his fastball at 100 mph. During his time with the Angels organization, Jenks spent much of his time on the disabled list because of elbow trouble. Jenks' career with the Angels ended when he was designated for assignment by the team in December 2004.

Chicago White Sox
On December 17, 2004, Jenks was claimed off of waivers by the Chicago White Sox for $20,000. He was sent to the club's Double-A affiliate, the Birmingham Barons to begin the 2005 season, posting a 1–2 with 19 saves and a 2.85 ERA in 35 appearances. Jenks was called up to the major leagues by the White Sox on July 5, 2005. The White Sox made it to the 2005 World Series, and Jenks pitched in each of the Series' four games. The White Sox won the series in four straight games over the Houston Astros, and Jenks pitched a total of five innings and made the series' final pitch. He recorded saves in Games 1 and 4, had a blown save in Game 2, and pitched scoreless 11th and 12th innings in the 14-inning Game 3. Jenks and Adam Wainwright of the  St. Louis Cardinals are the only rookie closers to earn a save in the clinching game of a World Series.

In 2006, Jenks was selected to the American League All-Star team, and finished the season 3–4 with a 4.00 ERA while converting 41 out of 45 save opportunities in 67 relief appearances. On September 25, 2007, Jenks was named as one of 10 finalist for the "DHL Presents the Major League Baseball Delivery Man of the Year Award".

In 2007, Jenks pursued a record streak of retiring consecutive batters. On August 10, 2007, Jenks retired his 38th consecutive hitter, Ichiro Suzuki of the Seattle Mariners, to tie the American League record for most consecutive batters retired in a row, set by David Wells between May 12, 1998, and May 23, 1998, then with the New York Yankees.

On August 12, 2007, in a game against the Seattle Mariners, Jenks retired his 41st consecutive batter, the Mariners' Yuniesky Betancourt, tying the Major League record held by San Francisco Giants pitcher Jim Barr, set over two games on August 23, 1972, and August 29, 1972. On August 20, 2007, Jenks allowed a base hit by Kansas City Royals outfielder Joey Gathright, ending his streak of 41 consecutive batters retired. However, Jenks was still able to get a save during the game.
Jenks' record is unique in that the previous record holders were starting pitchers. Wells' achievement bookended a perfect game that he pitched on May 17, 1998. Barr's achievement was spread across two games, neither of which was a no-hitter. In contrast, Jenks was perfect for 14 appearances over 27 days (July 17- August 12). His teammate Mark Buehrle broke the record for most consecutive batters retired on July 28, 2009, ending with 45 in a row.

On January 19, 2009, Jenks avoided arbitration and signed a one-year, $5.6 million contract.

On December 2, 2010, the White Sox declined to tender him a contract and he became a free agent.

Boston Red Sox
After the 2010 season, Jenks signed a two-year, $12 million contract with the Boston Red Sox on December 21, 2010. Jenks struggled for much of 2011 with injuries, going on the disabled list three times during the season. On September 13, 2011, the Red Sox announced that Jenks had been diagnosed with a pulmonary embolism. He pitched in 19 games during the season, going 2–2 with an ERA of 6.32.

Surgery complications
On December 12, 2011, Jenks had another surgery, this time to remove bone spurs from his back. He was supposed to have only two removed.  According to Jenks, Dr. Kirkham Wood, head of the orthopedic bone unit at Massachusetts General Hospital (MGH), started to remove a third bone spur and didn't finish it. This allegedly created a serrated edge that later sliced Jenks' back open in two places, causing him to leak spinal fluid and triggering an infection in his spine. Jenks was forced to undergo emergency surgery on December 28, only two weeks after his first back procedure. Due to his muscles being "torn open," as he put it, Jenks was bedridden for seven weeks. The Red Sox placed Jenks on the 60-day disabled list, and ruled him out for at least the first three months of the 2012 season.

On July 3, 2012, Jenks was released by the Red Sox. He sued Wood in 2015 for malpractice after learning that Wood was operating on a second patient at the same time as his operation. Jenks told The Boston Globe that he would have had his bone spur surgery elsewhere had he known about the overlapping schedules. On May 8, 2019, Jenks reached a settlement with MGH and Wood for $5.1 million.

Coaching career 
Beginning in May 2021, Jenks served as the pitching coach for the Grand Junction Rockies of the MLB Partner Pioneer League. Following the 2021 season, he was promoted to manager following the retirement of the team's previous manager Jimmy Johnson.

Personal
Jenks is remarried to Eleni Tzitzivacos, and has five children. , he lived in Malibu, California.

Jenks became addicted to painkillers shortly after his back injury and at one point was taking "probably up to 60+ pills a day. And, on some days that was probably on the low side." Between March and July 2012, he was arrested and charged twice for driving under the influence of painkillers.

References

External links

1981 births
Living people
Chicago White Sox players
Boston Red Sox players
American League All-Stars
Baseball players from California
Major League Baseball pitchers
Butte Copper Kings players
Cedar Rapids Kernels players
Arkansas Travelers players
Rancho Cucamonga Quakes players
Arizona League Angels players
Salt Lake Stingers players
Birmingham Barons players
Winston-Salem Warthogs players
Portland Sea Dogs players
Pawtucket Red Sox players
People from Mission Hills, Santa Barbara County, California